Anglo-Americans are people who are English-speaking inhabitants of Anglo-America. It typically refers to the nations and ethnic groups in the Americas that speak English as a native language, making up the majority of people in the world who speak English as a first language.

Usage 
The term is ambiguous and used in several different ways. While it is primarily used to refer to people of English ancestry, it (along with terms like Anglo, Anglic, Anglophone, and Anglophonic) is also used to denote all people of British or Northwestern European ancestry, such as Northwestern European Americans. It can include all people of Northwestern European ethnic origin who speak English as a mother tongue and their descendants in the New World.

Culture 
The term implies a relationship between the United States and the United Kingdom (specifically England), or the two countries' shared language, English, and/or cultural heritage. In this context the term may refer to an English American, a person from the United States whose ancestry originates wholly or partly in England, a person from the United States who speaks English as their first language (see American English), a collective term referring to those countries that have similar legal systems based on common law, relations between the United Kingdom and United States, or Anglo-American Cataloguing Rules, a national cataloging code.

The term is also used, less frequently, to denote a connection between English people (or the English language) and the Western Hemisphere as a whole. In this context, the term can mean a person from the Americas whose ancestry originates wholly or partly in England (see British diaspora) or a person from the Americas who is a white American and speaks English as their first language, a person from the Americas who speaks English as their first language (see English-speaking world and Languages of the Americas), or a person from Anglo-America.

The term Anglo-American is sometimes defined as including English-speaking countries around the world with similar values and demographics, including the United States, Canada, the United Kingdom, Australia and New Zealand.

Adjective 
The adjective Anglo-American is used in the following ways:
 to denote the cultural sphere shared by the United Kingdom, the United States and English Canada. For example, "Anglo-American culture is different from French culture." Political leaders including Winston Churchill, Franklin D. Roosevelt and Ronald Reagan have used the term to discuss the "Special Relationship" between Britain and America.
 to describe relations between Britain and the United States. For example, "Anglo-American relations became more relaxed after the War of 1812."

See also 

 Anglosphere

References 

 
Canadian people of English descent
 
 
 
Ethnic groups in Canada
European-American society
European Canadian
Jamaican people of British descent
Trinidad and Tobago people of British descent
Guyanese people of British descent